Mireille Grosjean (born 15 May 1946, in La Chaux-de-Fonds) is a Swiss Esperantist, president of the Swiss-Esperanto Society (SES), and president of the International League of Esperanto Teachers (ILEI) from 2013 till 2021. Her native language is French. She is a teacher about foreign languages.

References 

People from La Chaux-de-Fonds
1946 births
Swiss Esperantists
Swiss educators
Swiss women academics
Living people
Esperanto educators